Lenexa  is a city in Johnson County, Kansas, United States.  It is one of four principal cities of the Kansas City Metropolitan Area and 9th most populated city of Kansas.  As of the 2020 census, the population of the city was 57,434.  It is the birthplace of Garmin and the regional headquarters of Kiewit Construction.  It is bordered by the cities of Shawnee to the north, Overland Park to the east, De Soto to the west and Olathe to the south.

History

The trail meandered through this area on its way to Santa Fe, New Mexico.

On March 22, 1858, Hickok was elected one of the first four constables of nearby Monticello Township. Later, Hickok became a scout for the Free-State Army, a sharpshooter and eventually, one of the most famous folk heroes of the American West, Wild Bill Hickok.

At about the same time as Hickok filed his claim, a census of the Shawnee Indians living in the area was being taken, and one of the residents listed was Na-Nex-Se Blackhoof. She was the widow of Chief Blackhoof, the second signer of the 1854 treaty that ceded  of the Kansas Shawnee Indian reservation to the United States government.

In 1865, the Kansas and Neosho Valley Railroad was organized to take advantage of favorable new land laws. It later changed its name to Missouri River, Ft. Scott and Gulf Railroad, and in 1869 purchased a right-of-way from C.A. Bradshaw in the area that is now Lenexa, with the stipulation that a depot be built on the property.

Bradshaw also sold  to Octave Chanute, a railroad civil engineer, who platted the town in 1869. Legend states that the first town name proposed was "Bradshaw", but Bradshaw modestly refused and the name "Lenexa", a derivation of the name Na-Nex-Se, the name of Shawnee Chief Thomas Blackhoof's wife, was adopted.

Geography
Lenexa is located at  (38.964689, -94.759535).

Demographics

The median income for a household was $61,990, and the median income for a family was $76,321 (these figures had risen to $70,246 and $86,581 respectively as of a 2007 estimate). Males had a median income of $50,495 versus $32,166 for females. The per capita income for the city was $30,212. About 1.8% of families and 3.4% of the population were below the poverty line, including 2.9% of those under age 18 and 3.0% of those age 65 or over.

2010 census
As of the census of 2010, there were 48,190 people, 19,288 households, and 13,065 families living in the city. The racial makeup of the city was 84.4% White, 5.8% African American, 0.4% Native American, 3.8% Asian, 0.1% Pacific Islander, 3.0% from other races, and 2.5% from two or more races. Hispanic or Latino of any race were 7.3% of the population.

There were 19,288 households, of which 33.7% had children under the age of 18 living with them, 55.3% were married couples living together, 9.0% had a female householder with no husband present, 3.4% had a male householder with no wife present, and 32.3% were non-families. 25.2% of all households were made up of individuals, and 7.3% had someone living alone who was 65 years of age or older. The average household size was 2.48 and the average family size was 3.00.

The median age in the city was 36.6 years. 24.7% of residents were under the age of 18; 8.3% were between the ages of 18 and 24; 28.2% were from 25 to 44; 28.5% were from 45 to 64; and 10.3% were 65 years of age or older. The gender makeup of the city was 48.7% male and 51.3% female.

2000 census
As of the U.S. Census in 2000, there were 40,238 people, 15,574 households, and 10,559 families living in the city. The racial makeup of the city was 89.50% White, 6.50% Black or African American, 0.38% Native American, 3.63% Asian, 0.03% Pacific Islander, 1.60% from other races, and 1.61% two or more races. Hispanic or Latino of any race were 3.97% of the population. 24.8% were of German, 12.4% English, 12.1% Irish and 7.2% American ancestry.

There were 15,574 households, out of which 35.1% had children under the age of 18 living with them, 57.4% were married couples living together, 7.6% had a female householder with no husband present, and 32.2% were non-families. 24.3% of all households were made up of individuals, and 5.8% had someone living alone who was 65 years of age or older. The average household size was 2.54 and the average family size was 3.08.

In the city, the population was spread out, with 25.7% under the age of 18, 9.5% from 18 to 24, 32.0% from 25 to 44, 24.2% from 45 to 64, and 8.6% who were 65 years of age or older. The median age was 35 years. For every 100 females, there were 95.8 males. For every 100 females age 18 and over, there were 93.1 males.

Economy
Garmin was founded in Lenexa.

Largest employers
According to the City's 2015 Comprehensive Annual Financial Report, the largest employers in the city are:

Government
Lenexa is the home of a Records Center managed by the National Archives and Records Administration.  The facility stores federal records from agencies in Iowa, Kansas, Missouri, and Nebraska including Department of Veterans Affairs and the Internal Revenue Service. The facility is also known informally as "The Caves" and is known to store items from the trauma room at Parkland Memorial Hospital in Dallas, Texas, where John F. Kennedy was pronounced dead following his assassination. As of January 2020, the current Mayor of Lenexa is Michael Boehm and the current City Manager is Beccy Yocham.

Education
Lenexa does not have a public school district of its own. Instead, Lenexa students go to either Shawnee Mission School District, Olathe School District, or De Soto School District schools. It is also home to a handful of private schools. Lenexa's first private high school, St. James Academy, opened in 2005. The Johnson County Library has a branch in the Lenexa City Center. Wichita based Friends University also has a branch in Lenexa. The International Assembly for Collegiate Business Education is based in Lenexa; its competitive peer, the Accreditation Council for Business Schools and Programs, is based in neighboring Overland Park.

Culture

Events
Each June the city hosts "The Great Lenexa Barbecue Battle", which is also the Kansas State Championship. Lenexa was known as the "Spinach Capital of the World" in the 1930s and celebrates with the Spinach Festival every September.

Religion
Lenexa is home to the St. George Serbian Orthodox Church, a parish founded in Kansas City in 1906 and moved to Lenexa in 2006. The parish constructed a new Byzantine style church and cultural center. The church hosts a SerbFest every year in the summer and a Food Festival and Bazaar in the fall.

The Church of the Nazarene, an evangelical Protestant denomination which was headquartered for many years in Kansas City, moved its international headquarters to Lenexa in 2008.

Notable people

People who were born in or have lived in Lenexa include these:
 Warren Ault (1887-1989), historian
 Cam F. Awesome (1988- ), boxer
 Baron Corbin (1984- ), WWE Wrestler
 Madison Desch (1997- ), gymnast
 Drake Dunsmore (1988- ), football tight end
 Wild Bill Hickok (1837-1876), gunfighter. He worked as a stocktender at the nearby Reed Hotel and later was elected constable of Monticello Township. A park in his name is now in that area.
 Lucas Rodríguez (1986- ), soccer midfielder
 Paul Rudd, (1969- ), actor
 William Shaw (1955- ), biochemist, autism researcher
 Grace VanderWaal (2004- ), winner of the eleventh season of the NBC TV competition show America's Got Talent
 Jason Wiles (1970- ), actor, director, producer. Starred as Maurice 'Bosco' Boscorelli (1999–2005) in the television series Third Watch.
 Ron Worley (1945- ), Kansas state legislator

See also
 Oregon-California Trails Association

References

Further reading

External links

 City of Lenexa
 Lenexa - Directory of Public Officials
 Lenexa city map, KDOT

Cities in Kansas
Cities in Johnson County, Kansas
Cities in Kansas City metropolitan area
Populated places established in 1869
1869 establishments in Kansas